Sydney Hegele, formerly known as Sydney Warner Brooman, is a Canadian writer, whose debut short story collection, The Pump, was published in 2021.

Originally from Grimsby, Ontario, Hegele attended the University of Western Ontario and is currently based in Toronto. They identify as queer and use gender-neutral pronouns.

The Pump, a volume of interrelated short stories about outsiders living in a small town in Southern Ontario, was compared to the Southern Ontario Gothic style of writers such as Alice Munro. The book was the winner of the 2022 ReLit Award for short fiction, and was shortlisted for the 2022 Trillium Book Awards for English fiction. The book was also selected by CBC Books in 2022 as part of a Pride Month reading list of books by LGBTQ Canadian writers.

References

21st-century Canadian short story writers
Queer writers
Canadian non-binary writers
People from Grimsby, Ontario
University of Western Ontario alumni
Writers from Toronto
Living people
Year of birth missing (living people)
21st-century Canadian LGBT people